Nyassachromis serenus is a species of cichlid endemic to Lake Malawi where it is only known from the northern part of the lake, preferring habitats over sand-rock interfaces.  This species can reach a length of  TL.  It can also be found in the aquarium trade.

References

Fish of Malawi
serenus
Fish described in 1935
Taxonomy articles created by Polbot
Fish of Lake Malawi